Deon Cole's Black Box is an American comedy television series that premiered on June 10, 2013, on TBS. The series features Deon Cole (stand-up comic and comedy writer) as he provides his commentary on videos found via the internet and television. On October 25, 2013, Deon Cole announced via Twitter that Black Box would not be returning to TBS.

Episodes

References

External links

2010s American sketch comedy television series
2013 American television series debuts
2013 American television series endings
English-language television shows
TBS (American TV channel) original programming
Television series by Conaco
Television series by Warner Horizon Television